The 2007–08 LEB season is the 12th season of the Liga Española de Baloncesto.  The 612-game regular season (34 games for each of the 18 teams) began on Friday, September 21, 2007, and will end on Friday, May 16, 2008. The champion of the regular season will be promoted to ACB. The teams between 2nd and 9th position will play a best of 3 games play off between May 20 and May 27 to see who plays the Final Four in Cáceres, between May 31 and June 1. Two bottom teams will be relegated to LEB Plata.

LEB Oro Regular season 

1 Ciudad de Huelva relegated to LEB Bronce due economic problems.
2 CB Alcúdia disappeared.
3 Alerta Cantabria relegated to LEB Bronce due economic problems.
4 Basquetinca.com refounded with Bàsquet Muro under the name of Bàsquet Mallorca.
5 UB La Palma clinched a vacant LEB berth and was not relegated

LEB Oro Playoffs

Quarterfinals
Each quarterfinal was a best-of-three (if third serie necessary) series between teams in the 2-9 positions, with the best-place team receiving home advantage. All opening games were played on May 20, 2008, and all second games were played on May 24. The deciding third games were played on May 27.

* if necessary

Final Four
The Final Four is the last phase of the LEB Oro season, and is held over a weekend in Cáceres. The semifinal games are played on May 31. The championship final is played on June 1.

Stats Leaders

Points

Rebounds

Assists

LEB Oro seasons
LEB2
Spain
Second level Spanish basketball league seasons